Chi Wenyi (born 18 February 1988) is a Chinese footballer of Korean descent who currently plays for China Super League side Hebei China Fortune.

Club career
Chi Wenyi started his professional football career in 2004 when he was promoted to Yanbian FC's first squad. On 5 March 2016, Chi made his Super League debut in the first match of 2016 season against Shanghai Shenhua.

On 11 February 2018, Chi transferred to Super League side Beijing Sinobo Guoan. Failed to establish himself within the first team, he was loaned to Hebei China Fortune for the 2019 season on 28 February 2019.

International career
Chi Wenyi played as a back-up for Wang Dalei in the 2005 FIFA U-17 World Championship. He appeared in the tournament for China U17 once on 22 September 2005 in the last match of group stage against Ghana. On 10 January 2017, Chi made his debut for Chinese national team in the 2017 China Cup against Iceland.

Career statistics
Statistics accurate as of match played 31 December 2020.

Honours

Club
Yanbian FC
 China League One: 2015

References

External links
 
 

1988 births
Living people
Chinese footballers
People from Yanbian
Yanbian Funde F.C. players
Beijing Guoan F.C. players
Hebei F.C. players
Chinese Super League players
China League One players
Chinese people of Korean descent
China international footballers
Association football goalkeepers